Elliott Morris (born 4 May 1981) is a Northern Irish former goalkeeper.

Elliott played for Glentoran for twenty years, making his debut in 2002. Elliott Morris also represented Northern Ireland at "B" level and Under 21 level.

Early life
Growing up, Morris was a Crusaders fan who lived on the Shore Road, North Belfast, near Seaview with his parents Isobel and Gareth and his three brothers Reece, Bowden and Gareth.

Club career

Before Glentoran
Before joining Glentoran, Elliott had spells with Crusaders, West Brom and Doncaster Rovers, failing to make a senior appearance at all 3 clubs. He did however make 1 appearance for West Brom academy in a 0–0 FA Youth Cup final v Scunthorpe in April 2000, saving 2 penalties and scoring 1 in a shootout which was the last goal ever scored for West Brom at Wembley Stadium before Salomon Rondon scored for West Brom in a Premier League game against Tottenham in November 2017.

Glentoran
He started his Glentoran career in 2002, after signing from West Brom and has won several trophies in the process, he became the most capped Glentoran goalkeeper in a 3–0 win over Warrenpoint at the Oval on 7 November 2013. On 12 January 2019 Morris scored against Institute from inside his own half on his 723rd appearance for Glentoran.

International career
Morris has represented Northern Ireland at "B" level and Under 21 level.

References

External links
Official Glentoran website
Official Glentoran statistics provider

Association footballers from Northern Ireland
Association football goalkeepers
Glentoran F.C. players
NIFL Premiership players
Association footballers from Belfast
1981 births
Living people
Crusaders F.C. players
West Bromwich Albion F.C. players
Doncaster Rovers F.C. players